Vladislav Sapeya (born 11 June 1943) is a Belarusian sprinter. He competed in the men's 100 metres at the 1968 Summer Olympics representing the Soviet Union.

References

1943 births
Living people
Athletes (track and field) at the 1968 Summer Olympics
Belarusian male sprinters
Olympic athletes of the Soviet Union
Place of birth missing (living people)
Universiade bronze medalists for the Soviet Union
Universiade medalists in athletics (track and field)
Medalists at the 1970 Summer Universiade
Soviet male sprinters